Pour la peau d'un flic (English: For a Cop's Hide) is a 1981 French crime-thriller film starring and directed by Alain Delon. It was Delon's directorial debut.

It had admissions of 2,377,084 in France.

Plot
Choucas, a former police detective, is commissioned by an elderly lady to investigate the disappearance of her blind daughter, Marthe. The lady is murdered. Assisted by retired commissioner Haymann, and by secretary Charlotte, investigator Choucas attempts to unravel the thread of a fraud involving various police services and drug traffickers. During the investigation Choucas is attacked in the apartment of the victim by a certain Pradier; he kills him but his accomplice manages to escape. Back home, Choucas escapes an ambush tended by a certain commissioner Madrier and kills him, with the result of ending up in the viewfinder not only of a mysterious gang, but also of the police.

The story proceeds with a succession of events, including the kidnapping of Charlotte, saved at the last minute by her employer. Choucas will discover that he was maneuvered by the police commissioner Coccioli against his dishonest colleagues, and will risk to leave his life in an attempt to discover the truth and to strip the gang: it will be saved in extremis by policemen.

Cast 
 Alain Delon as Choucas 
 Anne Parillaud  as Charlotte 
 Michel Auclair  as  Haymann / Tarpon
 Daniel Ceccaldi  as Commissioner Coccioli 
 Jean-Pierre Darras  as Commissioner Chauffard 
 Xavier Depraz  as Kasper 
 Jacques Rispal as Professor Bachhoffer 
 Gérard Hérold  as Pradier 
 Pierre Belot as Jude 
 Annick Alane  as Isabelle Pigot 
 Pascale Roberts as Renée Mouzon 
   as Pérez 
 Philippe Castelli  as Jean le barman 
 Claire Nadeau as The TV presenter
 Brigitte Lahaie as The Nurse
 Dominique Zardi  as Le petit chauve 
 Henri Attal  as Le type au flipper  
 Mireille Darc  as La Grande sauterelle

References

External links

1981 films
French crime thriller films
1980s crime thriller films
Films based on French novels
1981 directorial debut films
Alain Delon
1980s French films